Luciano Gaucci (December 28, 1938 – February 1, 2020) was an Italian entrepreneur and sportsman. He was the owner of various clubs:
 Perugia Calcio, a football club based in Perugia, Umbria.
 Viterbese Calcio, a football club based in Viterbo, Lazio.
 S.S. Sambenedettese Calcio, a football club based in  San Benedetto del Tronto, Marche
 Calcio Catania, a football club based in Catania, Sicily.

He was also vice-president of the A.S. Roma football club during the presidential period of Dino Viola in the 1980s. He was born in Rome, Kingdom of Italy.

Gaucci was owner of the famous castle Torre Alfina in Acquapendente, Lazio.

Ahn controversy

During the 2002 World Cup, South Korean player Ahn Jung-Hwan - then on loan to Gaucci's Perugia football club - scored a golden goal that eliminated Italy from the World Cup. Furious, Gaucci immediately made public comments about cancelling Ahn's contract and was quoted as saying, "I have no intention of paying a salary to someone who has ruined Italian football." While he soon took back his words, and offered to outright buy Ahn's contract, Ahn rejected his penitence, with his agent stating, "He will never play again for Perugia... We will never consider his transfer to Perugia, which mounted a character assassination against Ahn just because he scored against Italy."

Thoroughbred horse racing
Luciano Gaucci also owned Allevamento White Star, a Thoroughbred horse breeding and racing operation who gained international fame in the late 1980s with the European Champion thoroughbred Tony Bin, winner of six Group One races including France's most prestigious event, the Prix de l'Arc de Triomphe. Gaucci also owned multiple stakes race winner Sikeston as well as Dr Devious, a colt he sold to American weight loss guru Sidney H. Craig and who won England's 1992 Epsom Derby.

Bankruptcy and escape
After Perugia Calcio went bankrupt in 2005, the Italian magistrature started an inquiry into he and his sons Alessandro and Riccardo. Following these events, Luciano Gaucci escaped to Santo Domingo, Dominican Republic where he stayed for four years in hiding. He was subsequently sentenced to a three-year suspended jail sentence. Gaucci returned to Italy in March 2009, but died in Santo Domingo, aged 81.

References

External links 
 Copy of October 5, 2003 article by Peter Popham on Luciano Gaucci in The Independent

1939 births
2020 deaths
Businesspeople from Rome
Italian football chairmen and investors
Italian racehorse owners and breeders
Owners of Prix de l'Arc de Triomphe winners
People of Marchesan descent